Kenneth Barker  (26 June 1934 – 9 January 2021) was a British academic administrator.

Biography
He was educated at the Royal College of Music, King's College London (BMus) and the University of Sussex (MA). He served as Vice-Chancellor of De Montfort University from 1992 to 1999 and as Vice-Chancellor of Thames Valley University from 1999 to 2003.

He was appointed CBE in the 1994 Birthday Honours for services to higher education.

He died in January 2021.

References

1934 births
2021 deaths
Alumni of the Royal College of Music
Alumni of King's College London
Alumni of the University of Sussex
People associated with De Montfort University
People associated with the University of West London
Commanders of the Order of the British Empire
British musicologists